Larissa or Larisa (Λάρισα) Phrikonis was a Bronze Age city in the Aegean Region of Turkey. It is in the immediate vicinity of Menemen, in the district of İzmir province. The ruins of the city are on a hill top next to today's Buruncuk village. The main road to Çanakkale from İzmir skirts the same hill, making a considerable curve to the northwest. It must also be emphasized that Larissa is very close to the Gediz River (called 'Hermus' in antiquity), which formed a fertile plain on its own delta, with the alluvial soil carried from the Anatolian inland.

The first nucleus of Larissa formed during the third millennium BC. The city survived all through the Persian and Hellenistic periods, though it was largely destroyed during the Peloponnesian War in 405 BC. Larissa was rebuilt after the War but was annihilated by the Galatians (Celts) in 279 BC. It is known as one of the twelve Aeolian cities. Strabo considered that this Larissa was the one mentioned in Homer's Iliad. Xenophon writes that Cyrus the Great established a colony of Egyptian soldiers there. Xenophon also relates that it was besieged in vain by Thimbrom. In Strabo's time it was deserted, although it is mentioned by other ancient geographers such as Pliny the Elder, Ptolemy, and Stephanus of Byzantium.

The first excavations in Larissa were initiated in 1902 by Swedish and German archeologists. The findings were taken to Stockholm and to İstanbul archeological museums.

References

Geography of İzmir Province
Archaeological sites in the Aegean Region
Cities in ancient Aeolis
Ancient Greek archaeological sites in Turkey
Populated places in ancient Aeolis
Former populated places in Turkey
History of İzmir Province